The 2016 AFC Cup was the 13th edition of the AFC Cup, Asia's secondary club football tournament organized by the Asian Football Confederation (AFC).

Al-Quwa Al-Jawiya defeated Bengaluru FC in the final to win their first AFC Cup title, becoming the first Iraqi team to win the competition. Johor Darul Ta'zim were the defending champions, but were eliminated in the semi-finals by Bengaluru FC.

Association team allocation
The AFC Competitions Committee proposed a revamp of the AFC club competitions on 25 January 2014, which was ratified by the AFC Executive Committee on 16 April 2014. The 46 AFC member associations (excluding the associate member Northern Mariana Islands) are ranked based on their national team's and clubs' performance over the last four years in AFC competitions, with the allocation of slots for the 2015 and 2016 editions of the AFC club competitions determined by the 2014 rankings:
The associations are split into West Zone and East Zone, with 23 associations in each zone:
West Zone consists of the associations from West Asia, Central Asia, South Asia, except India and Maldives
East Zone consists of the associations from ASEAN and East Asia, plus India and Maldives
In each zone, there are a total of 12 direct slots in the group stage, with the 4 remaining slots filled through play-offs.
All associations which do not receive direct slots in the AFC Champions League group stage are eligible to enter the AFC Cup.
The associations ranked 7th to 16th in each zone get at least one direct slot in the group stage (including losers of the AFC Champions League qualifying play-off), while the remaining associations get only play-off slots:
The associations ranked 7th and 8th each get two direct slots.
The associations ranked 9th to 12th each get one direct slot and one play-off slot (in play-off round).
The associations ranked 13th to 16th each get one direct slot and one play-off slot (in preliminary round).
The associations ranked 17th or below each get one play-off slot (in qualifying round).

The AFC Competitions Committee decided on the participation of member associations in the 2015 and 2016 editions of the AFC Cup on 28 November 2014.

The following table shows the slot allocation for the 2016 AFC Cup, which are adjusted accordingly since some of the slots are unused.

Notes

Teams
The following 40 teams from 23 associations entered the competition.

Notes

Schedule
The schedule of the competition was as follows (all draws are held in Kuala Lumpur, Malaysia).

Qualifying round

Group A

Group B

Qualifying play-off

Play-off round

Group stage

Group A

Group B

Group C

Group D

Group E

Group F

Group G

Group H

Knockout stage

Bracket

Round of 16

Quarter-finals

Semi-finals

Final

Awards

Top scorers

See also
2016 AFC Champions League

References

External links
AFC Cup, the-AFC.com

 
2
2016